Nishtar Medical University (formerly Nishtar Medical College) is a public sector health sciences university located in Multan, Punjab, Pakistan. It is one of the oldest medical institutions established after the creation of Pakistan. It offers degree programs in medicine, dentistry, allied health sciences and nursing. It is named after Sardar Abdur Rub Nishtar, Pakistan movement leader, and then Governor of Punjab, Pakistan.

Constituent colleges & programs offered 
1. Nishtar Medical College

Undergraduate program;
Bachelor of Medicine and Bachelor of Surgery (MBBS): a 5-year degree program

Postgraduate programs;
Medical residency and fellowship training in different specialties of medicine and surgery in affiliation with College of Physicians and Surgeons of Pakistan.

2. Nishtar Institute of DentistryUndergraduate program;
Bachelor of Dental Surgery (BDS): a 4-year program.

Postgraduate programs;
Residency and fellowship training in different specialties of dentistry in affiliation with College of Physicians and Surgeons of Pakistan.

3. Nishtar College of Nursing
Bachelor of Science in Nursing (BSN): a 4-year nursing degree program.

Affiliation 
The college was initially affiliated with University of the Punjab Lahore, the only university in Punjab at that time.
In 1975 it became affiliated with Bahauddin Zakariya University, a newly formed university for South Punjab.
In January 2003 it became affiliated with the University of Health Sciences, Lahore.
In September 2017, college was upgraded to university status after the passage of Nishtar Medical University Act by Provincial Assembly of Punjab.
In November 19, 2020 Pakistan Medical Commission (PMC) permitted Nishtar Medical University (NMU) to conduct MBBS and BDS examinations for undergraduates and MD/MS examinations for post-graduates.

Campus 

The university is located at a distance of 3 km from the city centre. Nishtar Hospital, one of the largest hospitals in Pakistan, is located adjacent to the college.

The city of Multan is one of the oldest localities of Pakistan; this is reflected in the architecture of the college and hospital – high ceilings and large windows are commonplaces. 

The college itself is spacious, with the various academic departments housed around a central quadrangle. The quadrangle is a large garden used for student functions and gatherings. There is an attached hospital, adjacent hostels, and faculty residential colony. The college as well as the hostels are nostalgic of old Islamic architecture. The buildings added to the campus in the 1960s to early 1980s were designed by A. R. Hye.

Admissions 
Medical & Dental College
Admission to all public medical & dental colleges is through a centralized system at the provincial level. Students are eligible to apply for MBBS or BDS programs after Higher Secondary School Certificate (HSSC) or equivalent examination. Candidates are selected by a rigorous admission process that includes a competitive Medical & Dental College Admission Test (MDCAT) conducted annually under the instruction of Pakistan Medical Commission. Merit is determined by the marks obtained on the MDCAT & Higher Secondary School Certificate (HSSC) or equivalent examination.

Foreign/International students can apply for admission through the Higher Education Commission of Pakistan.

College of Nursing
Students can apply for 4 year BSN program after HSSC or equivalent examination. There is no central admission policy for nursing colleges. Students apply directly to college of nursing for admission consideration. Students accepted to BSN program are offered monthly stipend equivalent to BS-17.

Student life 
Students come from province of Punjab and other parts of Pakistan, as well as from several other countries, including Jordan, Israel, Nepal, Sri Lanka, Bangladesh India  and other African and Asian countries. Most choose to live in the hostels on the campus.

Recognition 
The university is recognized for undergraduate and post-graduate medical training by the Pakistan Medical Commission and the College of Physicians and Surgeons of Pakistan.

Nishtar Medical University is also on the list of recognised universities of Higher Education Commission of Pakistan.

It is listed in the FAIMER International Medical Education Directory of International Medical Schools. Nishtar's graduates are eligible to appear in different countries medical licensing exams including United States Medical Licensing Examination (USMLE) and Professional and Linguistic Assessment Board test (PLAB) of UK.

Departments
Nishtar Medical University has the following departments:

Basic Health Sciences departments
Anatomy
Physiology 
Biochemistry
Behavioral Medicine
Forensic Medicine
Pathology
Pharmacology
Community Medicine
Medical Education
Human Nutrition and Dietetics

Clinical Health Sciences departments
Medicine
Surgery
Pediatrics
Obstetrics & Gynecology
Ophthalmology
Otorhinolaryngology

In addition, allied specialty exposure is ensured in different sub-specialties of medicine and surgery.

Teaching hospitals
Nishtar Hospital, Multan
Nishtar Institute of Dentistry, Multan

Alumni 
Nishtar Medical College graduates have a strong alumni presence in United States. Nishtar Medical College Alumni Association Of North America (NANA) 
continuess to fund one major project every year. Some of the continuing and past projects include 25 scholarships per year, extension project of the pediatrics ward, conference room in the ER, GI/Endoscopy suite, establishment of cardiac catheterization lab, IT and Simulation Lab for the students. Dr Asim Khalid Syed, head of Dengue Field Hospital at Expo Centre Lahore, is a Nishtar alumnus.

Founding Father
Jamal Bhutta was the founding principal and medical superintendent of the institute. He belongs to Bhutta family, city Sialkot

Impact of coronavirus
In July 2020, noted surgeon and vice chancellor of Nishtar Medical University, Mustafa Kamal Pasha, died after contracting the coronavirus.

References

External links
 Nishtar Medical University Official website of the university.
 Nishtar Medical College Alumni of North America Official website of Nishtar graduates who are in training or practice in North America.
 University of Health Sciences Lahore The university to which the college is affiliated.

Medical universities in Punjab, Pakistan
Medical colleges in Punjab, Pakistan
Universities and colleges in Multan
Public universities and colleges in Punjab, Pakistan
Educational institutions established in 1951
Nasreddin Murat-Khan buildings and structures
1951 establishments in Pakistan